The Portuguese Albums Chart ranks the best-performing albums in Portugal, as compiled by the Associação Fonográfica Portuguesa.

References 

2005 in Portugal
Portugal
Portuguese record charts